5-Chloro-β-keto-methiopropamine (5-Cl-βk-MPA) is a recreational designer drug with stimulant effects. It is a substituted cathinone derivative with a thiophene core, closely related to better known drugs such as βk-Methiopropamine and mephedrene. It was first identified in Hungary in 2017, and was made illegal in Hungary in 2018, and in Italy in 2020.

See also 
 3-Chloromethamphetamine
 3-Chloromethcathinone

References 

Cathinones
Designer drugs
Thiophenes
Chloroarenes